Villanueva del Árbol is a locality and minor local entity located in the municipality of Villaquilambre, in León province, Castile and León, Spain. As of 2020, it has a population of 205.

Geography 
Villanueva del Árbol is located 11km north-northeast of León, Spain.

References

Populated places in the Province of León